Laguna Creek is the name of several places and streams:

Places
Laguna Creek, Elk Grove, California, part of Elk Grove in Sacramento County, California
Laguna Creek High School, a secondary school in Elk Grove, California

Rivers

United States

Arizona
 Laguña Creek, a tributary to Chinle Creek, in Navajo County and Apache County, Arizona.

California
Arroyo de la Laguna, a tributary of Alameda Creek in Alameda County, California
Laguna Creek (Fremont), a creek also in Alameda County, just south of Alameda Creek in Fremont, but forming the independent Laguna Creek Watershed
Laguna Creek (San Mateo County), a tributary of San Mateo Creek in San Mateo County, California
Laguna Creek (Santa Cruz County)